Gujarat Lions were a franchise cricket team based in Rajkot, Gujarat, India, which played in the Indian Premier League (IPL) in 2016 and 2017. They were one of eight teams which competed in the 2017 Indian Premier League. The team was captained by Suresh Raina and coached by Brad Hodge. The side finished seventh in the league and did not qualify for the playoffs.

Standings

Match summary

Auction
The player auction for the 2017 season was held 20 February in Bangalore.

Squad
 Players with international caps are listed in bold.

Fixtures

Support staff changes
 In February 2017, Mohammad Kaif was named assistant coach of Gujarat Lions.

References

External links
Official website 
Gujarat Lions at CricBuzz

Indian Premier League
Sports clubs in India
Cricket clubs established in 2016
Cricket in Gujarat
2016 establishments in Gujarat
2017 Indian Premier League